The 1943–44 La Liga was the 13th season since its establishment. Valencia achieved its second title.

Team locations

League table

Results

Relegation play-offs
Match between Deportivo La Coruña and Constancia was played at Estadio Chamartín in Chamartín de la Rosa, while the other one was held at Camp de Les Corts, Barcelona.

|}

Top scorers

External links
Official LFP Site 

1943 1944
1943–44 in Spanish football leagues
Spain